Exoristoides homoeonychioides is a species of tachinid flies in the genus Exoristoides of the family Tachinidae.

External links

Tachinidae